Conversion units and operational conversion units (OCUs) were training units of the Royal Air Force (RAF).

History
With the introduction of new heavy bombers, the four-engined Short Stirling, Avro Lancaster, and Handley Page Halifax, the Royal Air Force introduced heavy conversion units (HCU). These HCUs began forming in late 1941, to qualify crews trained on medium bombers to operate the heavy bombers before final posting to the operational squadrons. Some of the HCUs were involved in bombing operations over Germany.

After the end of the Second World War, the role of the HCUs was taken over by the operational conversion units (OCUs). Although the units had nominal bases,  different flights and individual aircraft usually were detached nearer the operational bases.

RAF OCUs are training units that prepare aircrew for operations on a particular type or types of aircraft or roles. Some OCUs have a shadow, or reserve, squadron designation, which is used if the unit has a war role.

Current RAF OCUs
Lightning - RAF Marham
207 Squadron
Typhoon - RAF Coningsby
29 Squadron
Hawk - RAF Valley
4 Squadron - Hawk T.2
Support helicopter (Puma and Chinook) - RAF Benson
28 Squadron
Hercules - RAF Brize Norton
24 Squadron - OCU Flight
ISTAR - RAF Waddington
54 Squadron
Tutor - RAF Wittering
115 Squadron

Some aircraft types operated by a single squadron, which includes most transport aircraft, and most ISTAR aircraft, are not big enough to need a dedicated OCU squadron for their training requirements; they may only have a few at any time. Therefore, smaller squadrons also incorporate training facilities to allow them to process aircrew onto their aircraft type. Some roles, such as ISTAR, require more rear crew for the aircraft, such as weapon systems officers (WSOs) and weapon systems operators (WSOps) - their training can be more generalised, and this is carried out by 54 Squadron at RAF Waddington. This reduces the training requirement on the individual ISTAR squadrons, by providing aircrew who require only aircraft conversion training when they reach their squadrons. Pilots are trained directly onto their aircraft type by the frontline squadrons using training "flights". An example of this is the OCU flight of 24 Squadron, which trains new Hercules aircrew onto the aircraft.

OCUs are monitored by the RAF's Central Flying School to maintain training standards. Training is delivered by qualified flying instructors (QFIs) and qualified weapons instructors, and frontline squadrons also have qualified individuals to deliver continual and refresher training after the OCU. OCUs generally also provide training for those aircrew selected to become QFIs on an aircraft type - an example would be 208(R) Squadron, which currently trains aircrew for 100 Squadron, QFIs for 208(R), and provides refresher training for aircrew joining the RAF aerobatic team, the Red Arrows.

List of conversion units

Additional

See also 

Royal Air Force

List of Royal Air Force aircraft squadrons
List of Royal Air Force aircraft independent flights
List of Royal Air Force Glider units
List of Royal Air Force Operational Training Units
List of Royal Air Force schools
List of Royal Air Force units & establishments
List of RAF squadron codes
List of RAF Regiment units
List of Battle of Britain squadrons
List of wings of the Royal Air Force

Army Air Corps
List of Army Air Corps aircraft units
Fleet Air Arm'''
List of Fleet Air Arm aircraft squadrons
List of Fleet Air Arm groups
List of aircraft units of the Royal Navy
List of aircraft wings of the Royal Navy
Others
List of Air Training Corps squadrons
University Air Squadron
Air Experience Flight
Volunteer Gliding Squadron

References

Citations

Bibliography

 
 
 

 
Con